Greg Serano (born August 7, 1972) is an American actor. He is best known for his role of Pablo Betart on Wildfire and as Enrique Salvatore in Legally Blonde. He played a role in Power as Agent Juan Julio Medina.

Filmography

Film
Broken Horses (2015)
Terminator Salvation (2009) .... Hideki
Deadly Impact (2009) .... Ryan Alba
Undocumented (2009)
Felon (2008) .... Officer Diaz
Beer For My Horses (2008) .... Tito Garza
In the Valley of Elah (2007) .... Detective Manny Nunez
Wildfire (2005–2008) TV Series .... Pablo Betart
Kingpin (2003) TV Series .... Joaquin
National Security (2003) .... Carjacker
Saint Sinner (2002) (TV) .... Tomas Alcala
Frailty (2001) .... FBI Agent #1
Legally Blonde (2001) .... Enrique Salvatore
Semper Fi (2001) (TV) .... Garza
The Cross (2001) .... John
Road Dogz (2000) .... Alfonso Carrasco
The Postman (1997) .... California Carrier
The Journey: Absolution (1997)
The Rich Man's Wife (1996) .... Gangbanger

Television 
Castle, playing FBI Agent Napier in episode: "And Justice for All" (season 8, episode 13) 29 February 2016
Power, playing Agent Juan Julio Medina (2014–2018)
 Unforgettable, playing Detective Ben Cortez in episode: Trajectories (season 1, episode 10) 22 November 2011
North Shore, playing "Pedro Garcia" in episode: "Sucker Punch" (episode # 1.17) 9 December 2004
The Dead Zone, playing "Danny Avila" in episode: "The Combination" (episode # 2.18) 10 August 2003
The Twilight Zone, playing "Marco Flores" in episode: "Last Lap" (episode # 1.24) 11 December 2002
CSI: Crime Scene Investigation, playing "Javier Molina" in episode: "Fight Night" (episode # 3.7) 14 November 2002
The Pretender, playing "Manny" in episode: "Qallupilluit" (episode # 3.20) 22 May 1999
Touched by an Angel, playing "Jorge" in episode: "An Angel on the Roof" (episode # 5.11) 13 December 1998
Walker, Texas Ranger, playing "Hector Lopez" in episode: "Trackdown" (episode # 7.2) 3 October 1998
The Magnificent Seven, playing "Chanu" in episode: "Manhunt" (episode # 1.7) 14 March 1998
ER, playing "EVAC Pilot" in episode: "Family Practice" (episode # 4.14) 5 February 1998
Early Edition, in episode: "Return of Crumb" (episode # 2.14) 30 January 1998
Alright Already, playing "Cesar" in episode: "Again with the Black Box" (episode # 1.2) 21 September 1997
Diagnosis: Murder, playing "Roberto" in episode: "Blood Brothers Murder" (episode # 4.21) 10 April 1997
Dangerous Minds, playing Gusmaro Lopez 1996

See also
List of people from Brooklyn

References

External links

1972 births
Living people
20th-century American male actors
21st-century American male actors
Male actors from New York City
American male film actors
American male television actors
People from Brooklyn